Rahma Ali is a Pakistani actress and singer. She is known for her roles in dramas Nail Polish, Choti, Mol and Rukhsati.

Early life
Rahma was born on September 15 in 1988 in Lahore, Pakistan. She completed her studies from Beaconhouse National University.

Career
Rahma made her debut as an actress in 2011. She was noted for her roles in dramas Chupke Se Bahar Ajaye, Mere Apnay and Ghar Aik Jannat. She also appeared in drama Rukhsati, Nail Polish and Choti. Since then she appeared in drama Mol. In 2014 she joined Coke Studio and sang songs in dramas and movies. She also sang songs in drama Ranjha Ranjha Kardi and in movie Moor. In 2014 She appeared in movie Gidh.

Personal life
In 2019 Rahma married singer Sibtain Khalid in March. Rahma's sister Iman Ali is a model and actress and both of her parents are actors Abid Ali and Humaira Ali. Rahma's aunt Shama is also an actress.

Filmography

Television

Telefilm

Film

Discography

Coke Studio songs

TV series

Lollywood

Awards and nominations

References

External links
 
 
 

1988 births
Living people
21st-century Pakistani women singers
21st-century Pakistani actresses
Punjabi people
Pakistani television actresses
Punjabi-language singers
Pakistani film actresses
Urdu-language singers
Pakistani women singers
Singers from Lahore
Punjabi women
Lux Style Award winners
Pakistani playback singers
Actresses from Lahore
Urdu playback singers